This is a list of the National Register of Historic Places listings in Reagan County, Texas.

This is intended to be a complete list of properties and districts listed on the National Register of Historic Places in Reagan County, Texas. There is one property listed on the National Register in the county which is both a State Antiquities Landmark and a Recorded Texas Historic Landmark.

Current listings

The locations of National Register properties may be seen in a mapping service provided.

|}

See also

National Register of Historic Places listings in Texas
Recorded Texas Historic Landmarks in Reagan County

References

External links

Reagan County, Texas
Reagan County
Buildings and structures in Reagan County, Texas